William Benham may refer to:
William Benham (priest) (1831–1910), English churchman and writer
William Benham (zoologist) (1860–1950), New Zealand zoologist and biologist 
William Gurney Benham (1859–1944), English newspaper editor